The Santa Maria River is a river of Sergipe state in northeastern Brazil.

See also
List of rivers of Sergipe

References
Brazilian Ministry of Transport

Rivers of Sergipe